Holger Maletz (born 8 August 1967) is a German figure skater. He competed in the pairs event at the 1988 Winter Olympics.

References

External links
 

1967 births
Living people
German male pair skaters
Olympic figure skaters of West Germany
Figure skaters at the 1988 Winter Olympics
People from Salzgitter
Sportspeople from Lower Saxony